Sandy Edwards is an Australian photographer born in 1948. Edwards specialises in documentary photography and photographic curation. Born in Bluff, New Zealand in 1948 Edwards arrived in Sydney in 1961. Edwards was at the forefront of a group of progressive photographers in the 1970s and 80s who were driven to create documentary work that recorded social conditions and had the intent to change these conditions. Edwards' work largely drew from feminist ideals and the media's representation of women as well as the portrayal of Aboriginal communities in Australia.

Education
Edwards majored in psychology in 1969 at the University of Sydney NSW. She went on to study film at the Slade School of Fine Art in London between 1972 and 1973.

Feminism
Edwards, along with Helen Grace, Victoria Middleton and Lyn Silverman, formed the group "Blatant Image". Together they collaborated on photographic works that analysed the media's representation of women and created new works that contrasted these ideals.

Edwards' interest in the portrayal of women began when she was a teenager; collecting photos from magazines in the late 1960s, she began to see discrimination within the imagery. Another source was the movies of the 1930s and 1940s. Edwards was interested in these worlds of fantasy and in particular the construction of female sexual identity within them.

These influences pushed feminist views as a major point of her works, becoming most evident in A Narrative With Sexual Overtones (1983), which addressed the idea that no pleasure could be gained from the representation of women by the media, particularly film. The work was seen as a historical bridge between Marxist-feminist-semiotics and what would become feminist postmodernism further into the 1980s.

Notable works  
Edwards has participated in a wide array of photographic exhibitions throughout her career. Notable exhibitions include What’s in a face?: Points of View, AGNSW (2005-6); Close Relations, ACP (1998); and Shades of Light: Photography in Australia 1939-1988, NGA (1988). Her Sleep Late work of 2005-2006 was featured on a Melbourne billboard. Her body of work Paradise is a Place was highly acclaimed in the photographic community.

The CSR project
The CSR photography project (1978) was a commissioned body of work that looked into a range of social issues including both women's roles in the workplace and cultural differences in working environments. A range of Australian photographers participated in the project, including Max Dupain, Ed Douglas, Bill Henson and Debra Phillips. Each artist took a different approach to their work.

Edwards demonstrated the tedious and repetitious nature of women's work through sequential prints of women performing their daily routine. The photographs were taken in a sugar refinery and were titled "192 cubes", "Sugar in the morning", "4:00pm time to go home...", "Sook is from Korea", "Beti and Maria", and "Beti is from Yugoslavia, Sook is from Korea." The titles and work itself emphasised the monotony of the workplace for women as well as the cultural challenges. Each of her works was compiled of a series of images printed as gelatin silver prints in black and white.

Paradise is a Place
Paradise is a Place (1997) was a body of work published by Random House in collaboration with writer Gillian Mears. Edwards' photography was accompanied by Mears' non-fiction reminiscences of her childhood. The work looked into childhood on a broad spectrum. Edwards' photography portrayed the vulnerability and innocence of a young girl on the South Coast, New South Wales as she progresses from youth into adulthood. As well as being a published work, the   images were exhibited as a solo exhibition printed as black and white silver gelatin prints displayed at the Royal Botanic Gardens, Sydney, Australia, 23 February through 31 March 1996.

Current work
Sandy Edwards is still a practicing documentary photographer with over twenty years of experience in the field. She has also curated a number of major photographic exhibitions, including Sydney Airport 2000 Art Project, and Sydney Looking Forward; Art and about (2003).

In 2012 Edwards opened the ArtHere Exhibition space in Redfern, which held seventeen exhibitions in its first year. She  has also curated Stills Gallery in Sydney since 1991, a highly recognised and well established exhibition space which represents photographers such as Trent Parke, Anne Ferran and William Yang.

Edwards' most recent exhibition titled "Indeniable" was a retrospective displayed at Stills Gallery in 2004. The exhibition was compiled of large Type C photographic prints. The series was shot in colour and the photographs were taken over a period of ten years. The exhibition gave a vibrant insight into Edwards' life and the lives of those around her.

Recognitions

Edwards' work has received awards from the following organizations:

| width="50%" align="left" valign="top" style="border:0"|
Sleep Late, Yarras Edge Urban Project, MIRVAC Docklands, Melbourne - 2006
 Out of Time Grant for Welcome to Brewarrina - Australian Council Grant to Budapest with Indigenous Artist - 1991
 After 200 Years project - Australian Institute of Aboriginal Studies Commission - 1988
| width="50%" align="left" valign="top" style="border:0"|
Parliament House Photography Commission - 1986 
 Grant for Blatant Image - Woman Photographers Group - 1981

Exhibitions

Photographic

The Challenged Landscape
20 April 2010 – 21 May 2010 - UTS Gallery, Sydney

Double Exposure, 10 Contemporary Art Photographers
2010 - Viscopy Contemporary Artspace, Sydney

Oculi: Terra Australia Incognita
2010 - Manly Art Gallery, Sydney

Indelible
2004 - Stills Gallery, Sydney

Australian Postwar Photodocumentary
2004 - Art Gallery of New South Wales, Sydney

Momiji: An Autumn in Japan
2001 - Gallery East, Clovelly, NSW. This joint exhibition with Stephen Jones exhibited a set of photographic series of Jones' time in Japan.

Skin: Women on Women (WOW)
2000 - Stills Gallery, Sydney

First Love, in Close Relations
1999 - Australian Centre for Photography, Sydney

Paradise is a Place
1996 - Royal Botanic Gardens, Sydney

Inheritance
1996 - Australian Centre for Photography, Sydney

Peer Pressure
1993 - Sydney, NSW - a slide show on notions of family in 'Writing Through the Lens' session at Sydney Writers Festival

Brewarrina Photos with Boomalli artists
1992 - Vigado Gallery, Hungary

Images of Men
1990 - L'Otel, Sydney

Welcome to Brewarrina
1990 - Tin Sheds Gallery, University of Sydney, NSW. This joint exhibition with Joe Hurst was opened by Aboriginal artist, poet and activist Kevin Gilbert.

Passion
1989 - Richard King Gallery, Sydney, NSW. This exhibition was part of the Bulletin Photography competition.

More Than A Document, Art at Work
1988 - Roar Two, Melbourne

Australian Photography
1988 - Gary Anderson Gallery, Sydney

A Changing Relationship: Aboriginal Themes in Australian Art 1938-1988
1988 - S.H. Ervin Gallery, Sydney, NSW

Shades of Light-Photography and Australia 1839 to 1988
1988 - Australian National Gallery, Canberra

Living in the 70s: Australian Photographs
1987 - National Gallery of Australia, Canberra

Image Perfect: Australian fashion Photography in the 1980s
1987 - Australian Centre for Photography, Sydney

Parliament House Photography Commission: selected works
1986 - Drill Hall, Canberra

CSR Photography Project (regional tour)
1985 - Queensland Art Gallery. The exhibitions were the regional tour for the CSR project.

Three Photographers
1984 - Australian Centre for Photography, Sydney, NSW. This was a joint exhibition with Ann Graham and Grace Cochrane.

Curatorial
Portraits
1991 - Stills Gallery, Sydney

The Intimate Experience
1991 - Ivan Dougherty Gallery, Sydney, NSW

The Nude in Photography 1860-1991
1991 - Josef Lebovic Gallery, Sydney

References

1948 births
Living people
Australian photographers
Australian women photographers